Glukhovka is a rural locality (a selo) and the administrative center of Glukhovskoye Rural Settlement, Alexeyevsky District, Belgorod Oblast, Russia. The population was 939 as of 2010. There are 13 streets.

Geography 
Glukhovka is located 14 km north of Alexeyevka (the district's administrative centre) by road. Gorodishche is the nearest rural locality.

References 

Rural localities in Alexeyevsky District, Belgorod Oblast
Biryuchensky Uyezd